Pranjani is a village in the municipality of Gornji Milanovac, Serbia. In 1944, Pranjani was the site of Operation Halyard.

In 2019, a small wooden guest house was transfer by truck to a new location, in the churchyard, where it is planned to be reconstructed as part of traditional folk architecture. This was a big event for the local inhabitants, especially for the youngest. During 2020, the wooden church and a small guest house were reconstructed and conserved.

Gallery

References

Populated places in Moravica District